The 2013 South American U-20 Championship was an international association football tournament held in Argentina. The ten national teams involved in the tournament were required to register a squad of 22 players; only players in these squads are eligible to take part in the tournament.

Each player had to have been born after 1 January 1993.
(Source for player names:)

Players names marked in bold have been capped at full international level.

Argentina
Coach: Marcelo Trobbiani

Bolivia
Coach: Marcelo Barrero

Brazil
Coach: Emerson Ávila

Chile
Coach: Mario Salas

Colombia
Coach: Carlos Restrepo

Ecuador
Coach: Julio César Rosero

Paraguay
Coach: Víctor Genés

Peru
Coach: Daniel Ahmed

Uruguay
Coach: Juan Verzeri

Venezuela
Coach: Marcos Mathias

References

South American U-20 Championship squads